Dr. Robert Cane (1807–1858), was born in Kilkenny, Ireland in 1807.  He was a member of the Repeal Association and the Irish Confederation. He qualified as an M.D. in 1836, became a member of Kilkenny Corporation and was Mayor twice.

He was the model for Dr. Kiely in Charles J. Kickham's Knocknagow. He was MD of the University of Glasgow. He influenced James Stephens and Charles Kickham. He corresponded with Thomas Davis. He was visited by Charles Gavan Duffy and by Thomas Carlyle.

Robert Cane was educated locally and then worked for a time as an assistant to a pharmacist. He later went on to study medicine at Trinity College Dublin and at the Royal College of Surgeons in Ireland. During his time at Trinity he became involved in student politics and attended meetings about national issues of the day. He returned to Kilkenny to give medical assistance during the cholera epidemic of 1832. Robert Cane later moved to Edinburgh where he was awarded his MD at Edinburgh Medical School in 1836.

Following graduation from Edinburgh, Cane returned to Kilkenny where he set up a practice in the city. He became involved in national affairs and in local politics in Kilkenny where he was friendly with the writer John Banim. He also joined Daniel O'Connell's Repeal Association. In 1840 he hosted a banquet for Daniel O'Connell during a visit by the Liberator to the city. Robert Cane was elected Mayor of Kilkenny in 1844.

William Smith O'Brien founded the Irish Confederation in 1847 when he and others withdrew from the Repeal Association. Robert Cane joined the Confederation, however his views, particularly on the use of violence, were at variance with the Confederation and he took no part in the Rising of 1848. Despite this he was arrested and imprisoned following the Young Irelander Rebellion in the year 1848 on 29 July. The Rising had led to the suspension of Habeas Corpus and resulted in Cane being imprisoned for a lengthy period. Following his release he was again elected mayor of Kilkenny. On 19 February 1849 he was one of group of people who met to establish an Archaeological Society for the 'County and City of Kilkenny and surrounding districts'. He was eventually elected chairman of the organisation Kilkenny Archaeological Society on 3 April 1849.

Dr Cane founded the Celtic Union in Kilkenny in 1853. It was a literary society with a strong political bias and intended to publish material relating to Irish history. The Union produced a magazine called 'The Celt' and Cane acted as editor. Dr Cane died of consumption on 16 August 1858. He is buried in St. John's Graveyard, very close to his friend John Banim.
In 1859 a series of articles entitled 'History of the Williamite and Jacobite Wars of Ireland from their origin to the capture of Athlone' which he had written were published by the Celtic Union.

References

Further reading
A lengthy biographical article is to be found in the Irish Quarterly Review (1858). Short biographies appear in the Dictionary of National Biography and the Oxford Dictionary of National Biography.
The Politics of Irish Literature: from Thomas Davis to W.B. Yeats, Malcolm Brown, Allen &  Unwin, 1973.
John Mitchel, A Cause Too Many, Aidan Hegarty,	Camlane Press.
Thomas Davis, The Thinker and teacher,	Arthur Griffith, M.H. Gill & Son 1922.
Brigadier-General Thomas Francis Meagher His Political and Military Career,Capt. W. F. Lyons, Burns Oates & Washbourne Limited 1869
Young Ireland and 1848, Dennis Gwynn, Cork University Press 1949.
Daniel O'Connell The Irish Liberator, Dennis Gwynn, Hutchinson & Co, Ltd.
O'Connell Davis and the Colleges Bill,	Dennis Gwynn, Cork University Press 1948.
Smith O'Brien And The "Secession", Dennis Gwynn,Cork University Press
Meagher of The Sword,	Edited By Arthur Griffith, M. H. Gill & Son, Ltd. 1916.
Young Irelander Abroad The Diary of Charles Hart, Edited by Brendan O'Cathaoir,	University Press.
John Mitchel First Felon for Ireland, Edited By Brian O'Higgins, Brian O'Higgins 1947.
Rossa's Recollections 1838 to 1898, Intro by Sean O'Luing, The Lyons Press 2004.
Labour in Ireland, James Connolly, Fleet Street 1910.
The Re-Conquest of Ireland, James Connolly, Fleet Street 1915.
John Mitchel Noted Irish Lives, Louis J. Walsh, The Talbot Press Ltd 1934.
Thomas Davis: Essays and Poems, Centenary Memoir, M. H Gill, M.H. Gill & Son, Ltd MCMXLV.
Life of John Martin,	P. A. Sillard,	James Duffy & Co., Ltd 1901.
Life of John Mitchel,	P. A. Sillard,	James Duffy and Co., Ltd 1908.
John Mitchel,	P. S. O'Hegarty, Maunsel & Company, Ltd 1917.
The Fenians in Context Irish Politics & Society 1848–82, R. V. Comerford, Wolfhound Press 1998
William Smith O'Brien and the Young Ireland Rebellion of 1848,	Robert Sloan, Four Courts Press 2000
Irish Mitchel,	Seamus MacCall,	Thomas Nelson and Sons Ltd 1938.
Ireland Her Own, T. A. Jackson, Lawrence & Wishart Ltd 1976.
Life and Times of Daniel O'Connell, T. C. Luby, Cameron & Ferguson.
Young Ireland,	T. F. O'Sullivan, The Kerryman Ltd. 1945.
Irish Rebel John Devoy and America's Fight for Irish Freedom, Terry Golway, St. Martin's Griffin 1998.
Paddy's Lament Ireland 1846–1847 Prelude to Hatred, Thomas Gallagher,	Poolbeg 1994.
The Great Shame, Thomas Keneally, Anchor Books 1999.
James Fintan Lalor, Thomas, P. O'Neill, Golden Publications 2003.
Charles Gavan Duffy: Conversations With Carlyle (1892), with Introduction, Stray Thoughts On Young Ireland, by Brendan Clifford, Athol Books, Belfast, . (Pg. 32 Titled, Foster's account of Young Ireland.)
Envoi, Taking Leave of Roy Foster, by Brendan Clifford and Julianne Herlihy, Aubane Historical Society, Cork.
The Falcon Family, or, Young Ireland, by M. W. Savage, London, 1845. (An Gorta Mor) Quinnipiac University

External links
 http://www.libraryireland.com/biography/RobertCane.php

1807 births
1858 deaths
19th-century Irish medical doctors
Irish general practitioners
Irish editors
Mayors of Kilkenny
Politicians from County Kilkenny
Members of Kilkenny Archaeological Society
19th-century deaths from tuberculosis
Tuberculosis deaths in Ireland